The Northwest School (originally The Northwest School of the Arts, Humanities and Environment) is a private/independent day and boarding school located on Seattle, Washington's First Hill. The school was founded in 1980 and is primarily located in the 1905 Summit School building, an official City of Seattle landmark that was listed in the National Register of Historic Places in 1979.

The school's student body includes approximately 500 day and boarding students, in grades 6-12, some 16% of whom are from outside the United States. The school has attracted international students for decades, and international opportunities for domestic students range from Central America to Ethiopia.

As of 2020, school review website Niche ranks The Northwest School as the third-best boarding high school, eleventh best private high school, and the twelfth best college prep private high school in Washington state.

History

The Northwest School was founded in 1980 by Ellen Taussig, Paul Raymond, and Mark Terry.

Alongside the historic Summit School building and the school's dormitory for boarding students, modern additions to the Northwest campus were completed in 2006 (expanded photography studio, library, and computer lab) and 2014 (gymnasium, fitness mezzanine, dining room, kitchen, black-box theatre and a roof-top sports field).

Academics

The school's Humanities program encompasses history, literature and art history in a lecture and discussion format. All high school students take a three-year Humanities core program, one year each of Physical Science, Biology, and Chemistry, and a minimum of three years each of mathematics and a foreign language. Students take two fine art classes each year and must complete at least one class each of theater, visual art, music, and dance before graduation. Fine Arts classes are taught by recognized practitioners.

The school's seniors undertake one advanced seminar in writing, philosophy or literature, and another in the social studies—such as an introductory law seminar, post-colonial studies, Latin American studies, Asian studies, and women's studies. The social studies seminar requires completion of two senior projects: volunteer activity with a political campaign during the fall and a written thesis during the second half of the year. Seniors simultaneously continue with a full academic course load that includes 2-3 courses from the mathematics, science, or language departments and at least one arts course.

Athletics

Sports played at Northwest include Soccer, Cross country running, Track and Field, Basketball, Volleyball, Ultimate Frisbee, and Fitness Team. The school's administration also works to facilitate student participation in city, regional and other intramural sports, such as golf, swimming, water polo and crew.

The Northwest School is very competitive in Ultimate Frisbee. The upper school's varsity men have won Western National Championships in 2005, 2006, 2007 and 2011, and Northwest students made up half of the team that captured the Club National Championship in the summers of 2005 and 2007. In fall 2011, the boys' varsity team had a perfect record of 23-0, winning the inaugural Seattle Invite and the Washington State Championship along the way. That year, both the male and female varsity teams won the Western National Championships and the Washington State Championships. Middle school and high school participation combined is over 30% of the student population.

Notably, Maddie Meyers placed first in the WIAA 1A state cross country championships in 2008, 2009, 2010, and 2011, first in the 1600m and 3200m at the state track championships in 2009, 2010, and 2011, and first in the 800m at the state track championships in 2010 and 2011. She also competed in the 2011 IAAF World Youth Championships.

Northwest School State Titles

Boys Ultimate Frisbee- 2003, 2004, 2005, 2006, 2009, 2010, 2011, 2012, 2013

Girls Ultimate Frisbee- 2006, 2007, 2009, 2011, 2013, 2014

Girls Cross-Country- 2015, 2016

Notable alumni
Liz Mair, political strategist
Emmett Shear, technologist and entrepreneur, cofounder of Justin.tv and Twitch
Jason Finn, musician, Presidents of the United States of America
Stone Gossard, musician, Pearl Jam
Chiwoniso Maraire, Zimbabwean singer, songwriter, and exponent of Zimbabwean mbira music
Jake Shears, musician, Scissor Sisters
Steve Turner, musician, Mudhoney
Aya Sumika, actress, Numb3rs
Smoosh (Asy, Chloe, & Maia)
Andrew Callaghan, journalist, All Gas No Brakes

References

External links

 http://www.northwestschool.org/
 The Association of Boarding Schools profile

Schools in Seattle
1900s architecture in the United States
High schools in King County, Washington
Private high schools in Washington (state)
National Register of Historic Places in Seattle
School buildings on the National Register of Historic Places in Washington (state)
Private middle schools in Washington (state)
First Hill, Seattle